is a Japanese shōjo manga artist best known for her science fiction series Please Save My Earth and its sequels, which she has worked on for most of her career.

Life and career 
Hiwatari's parents owned a bookstore while she was growing up, which gave her easy access to reading books, magazines and manga. She especially liked the science fiction novels of Shinichi Hoshi and Yasutaka Tsutsui as well as manga by Osamu Tezuka, Hideko Mizuno, Yumiko Oshima, Moto Hagio, Keiko Takemiya as well as Ritusko Abe's Suekko Taifū, Mitsuteru Yokoyama's Babel II and Masami Kurumada's Saint Seiya.

Her first work, Mahōtsukai wa Shitteiru (I Know a Magician) was published in the weekly shōjo anthology Hana to Yume (Flowers and Dreams) in 1982. Her best-known work was Please Save My Earth, a 21-volume series concerning several alien scientists who are reincarnated as high school students in modern Tokyo. The series was adapted into an anime and translated into several languages.

After finishing Please Save My Earth, she was troubled about not creating another series as successful as her previous one. With the creation of Global Garden, this feeling disappeared.

Style 
In a 2022 interview, she said that her current work is created completely digitally.

Works

 (January 20, 1982, published in Hana to Yume, Hakusensha)
 (July 20, 1982, published in Hana to Yume, Hakusensha)
 (October 27, 1982, published in Hana to Yume, Hakusensha)
 (February 19, 1983, published in Hana to Yume, Hakusensha)
 (July 5, 1983, published in Hana to Yume, Hakusensha)
 (November 5, 1983, published in Hana to Yume, Hakusensha)
 (December 10, 1983, published in Bessatsu Hana to Yume, Hakusensha)
 (March 19, 1984, published in Hana to Yume, Hakusensha)
 (August 4, 1984, published in Hana to Yume, Hakusensha)
 (January 7, 1985, published in Hana to Yume, Hakusensha)
 (March 20, 1985 – April 5, 1985, serialized in Hana to Yume, Hakusensha)

 (May 4, 1982, published in Hana to Yume, Hakusensha)
 (October 5, 1982, published in Hana to Yume, Hakusensha)
 (January 6, 1983, published in Hana to Yume, Hakusensha)
 (April 20, 1983, published in Hana to Yume, Hakusensha)
 (April 27, 1983, published in Hana to Yume, Hakusensha)
 (August 20, 1983 – October 5, 1983, serialized in Hana to Yume, Hakusensha)
{{nihongo|Akuma-Kun Boku wa Tenshi ni Naritai' '|アクマくん ぼくは天使になりたい|}} (January 20, 1984, published in Hana to Yume, Hakusensha)
 (July 19, 1984, published in Akuma-Kun Boku wa Tenshi ni Naritai, Hakusensha)
 (September 5, 1984 – November 20, 1984, serialized in Hana to Yume, Hakusensha)
 (July 20, 1985 – July 5, 1986, serialized in Hana to Yume, Hakusensha)
 (September 5, 1986 – September 20, 1986, serialized in Hana to Yume, Hakusensha)

 (May 4, 1984 – June 5, 1984, serialized in Hana to Yume, Hakusensha)
 (March 9, 1985, published in Bessatsu Hana to Yume, Hakusensha)
 (June 10, 1985, published in Hana Yume Epo, Hakusensha)
 (January 28, 1987 – May 28, 1988, serialized in Hana Yume Epo, Hakusensha)
 (July 5, 1997 – August 5, 1997, serialized in Hana to Yume, Hakusensha)
 (April 5, 1999, published in Hana to Yume, Hakusensha)
 (December 20, 1986 – May 20, 1994, serialized in Hana to Yume, Hakusensha); spin-off of Vivid Remembrance (September 5, 1994 – December 19, 1998, serialized in Hana to Yume, Hakusensha)
 (August 11, 1998, published in Melody, Hakusensha)
 (August 5, 1999 – January 5, 2001, serialized in Hana to Yume, Hakusensha)
 (June 28, 2001, published in The Hana to Yume, Hakusensha)
 (August 4, 2001 – December 4, 2004, serialized in Hana to Yume, Hakusensha)
 (September 26, 2003 – November 26, 2014, serialized in Bessatsu Hana to Yume and Hana to Yume Plus, Hakusensha); sequel to Please Save My Earth (May 26, 2009, published in Bessatsu Hana to Yume, Hakusensha); Embraced by the Moonlight short story
 (September 26, 2014, published in Bessatsu Hana to Yume, Hakusensha); Please Save My Earth short story
 (March 26, 2015–ongoing, serialized in Bessatsu Hana to Yume, Hakusensha); sequel to Embraced by the Moonlight (February 19, 2016, published in the Please Save My Earth Premium Fan Book, Hakusensha); Please Save My Earth'' short story

References

External links

1961 births
Living people
Manga artists from Kanagawa Prefecture